Affonso Coelho da Silva (born 24 July 1934) is a Brazilian sprinter. He competed in the men's 100 metres at the 1960 Summer Olympics.

References

1934 births
Living people
Athletes (track and field) at the 1959 Pan American Games
Athletes (track and field) at the 1960 Summer Olympics
Athletes (track and field) at the 1963 Pan American Games
Brazilian male sprinters
Olympic athletes of Brazil
Place of birth missing (living people)
Pan American Games athletes for Brazil